Modderfontein is a small town on the East Rand of Gauteng, South Africa. It began as a mining town adjacent to the Mud River, hence its name which is Afrikaans for Mud spring or fountain. It is located in the City of Johannesburg Metropolitan Municipality, adjacent to Kempton Park in the neighbouring City of Ekurhuleni Metropolitan Municipality.

Flag
The flag of Modderfontein comprised the shield from the municipal arms being placed in the centre of a white field. The shield can be described as a white saltire on a blue background superimposed in the middle of which are crossed hammers in black. Above the crossed hammers is a protea in its natural colours of red and green while below is a schematic representation of water in blue and white.

The protea, the national flower of South Africa, symbolises the commitment of Modderfontein to serving the country for the benefit of all its people. Modderfontein has served South Africa through the manifold skills needed for the various products and services produced in the town and by sharing this with the broader community, making the country a better place in which to live.

The crossed hammers symbolise industry and mining, the trademarks of the first products produced in the town. They also indicate an unbroken tradition of serving the country's industrial and mining sectors.

The water symbolises pure, clean spring water and alludes to the name given to the town.

History
Carl Friedrich Wolff was born on Christmas Eve 1851 in Kempten, the capital of the Austro-Bavarian district Allgäu in South Germany. After school and an early training in the iron and steel industry, he moved to London and in 1873, embarked on a financial career. In 1875 his company, Adolph Mosenthal & Co. transferred him to South Africa where he took command of the accounting division in the Port Elizabeth branch. In 1880 he was transferred to Bloemfontein where he married Maria Fichardt, granddaughter of Carl Wuras, a noted missionary.

In 1888, Wolff was transferred to Pretoria to establish a branch office. He became a leading figure among the German community and was elected as chairman of the local German Club. From Pretoria he moved to Johannesburg to open another branch office and became a founder member and the first chairman of the German Club in the city.

Because of his German origin, Carl Friedrich Wolff was a natural choice as a go-between for the Z.A.R. in their transactions with the Nobel Trust, who were building the dynamite factory. The Nobel company had established the Zuid-Afrikaansche Fabrieken voor Ontplofbare Stoffen and had appointed Wolff as local director in South Africa (although he apparently retained his connections with his English employers).

The Nobel Trust exercised complete financial control over the dynamite factory and Wolff's major role appears to have been as negotiator with the Z.A.R. government and local landowners. During the establishment of the dynamite factory and the delicate negotiations which evolved as a result of the private rail link from the factory to Zuurfontein, Wolff played a prominent part.

The exciting events taking place at this time can well be imagined. Gold fever had gripped the Witwatersrand and the dynamite factory was a vital industrial necessity. Land speculation was rife, community development was beginning to take shape and Carl Wolff, at the peak of his career, was right in the heart of the drama.

Establishing the rail link was of prime importance and successful negotiation with the owners of the farm Zuurfontein, the Buitendags, was crucial. The Buitendags' great complaint was that the existing railway line already divided their property and some 113 morgen on the east side of the farm was completely cut off from the main property. The new railroad to the dynamite factory would further divide their property and disrupt their farming operations.

Modderfontein New City 

Modderfontein New City, or Modderfontein Mega City, was a  project approved for construction in Modderfontein. The project was designed by the Shangai Zendai Group and was expected to cost $8 billion, roughly R84 million at the time, however due to a disagreement between the developers and the City of Johannesburg, the project was abandoned.

The land has since been sold to a developer who has begun construction of a much more scaled down project, in the form of a gated-community style housing development. This has led to the southern suburbs of Modderfontein (Greenstone, Thornhill, Lakeside, Westlake and Longmeadow) being very developed while the north is relatively untouched, including the Modderfontein Nature Reserve. The original town centre has been preserved.

References

Populated places in the City of Johannesburg
Planned cities